The MDR-NUDIX RNA motif is a conserved RNA structure that was discovered by bioinformatics.
The MDR-NUDIX motif is found in the poorly studied phylum TM7.

MDR-NUDIX motif RNAs likely function as cis-regulatory elements, in view of their positions upstream of protein-coding genes.
Indeed, the RNAs are upstream of multiple genes that encode non-homologous proteins.  If all examples of the RNA were upstream of homologous genes, there is the possibility that the RNAs were conserved in that position simply by inheritance.  The non-homology of the genes downstream of MDR-NUDIX RNAs makes this scenario less likely.  Most MDR-NUDIX RNAs are located upstream of genes that encode multidrug resistance transporters or the NUDIX protein domain, which is a hydrolase of various nucleoside diphosphate derivatives.

References

Non-coding RNA